A cricket team representing the Leicestershire Cricket Board played seven List A cricket matches between 1999 and 2002. This is a list of the players who appeared in those matches.

Stephen Adshead, 1 match, 2001 
David Brignull, 2 matches, 1999–2001
James Bull, 1 match, 2001 
Craig Crowe, 4 matches, 2000–2002
Nicholas Ferraby, 2 matches, 2002 
Paul Fisher, 3 matches, 1999–2001
Dan Furnival, 1 match, 2001 
Karl Geary, 2 matches, 2001 
Christopher Griffiths, 3 matches, 1999–2001
Jamie Hart, 2 matches, 2001 
Jamil Hassan, 1 match, 2001 
Richard Hutchings, 4 matches, 1999–2001
Craig Macconacie, 2 matches, 2002 
Neal Mackey, 1 match, 2002 
Olsen Murrain, 2 matches, 2001 
Jigar Naik, 2 matches, 2002 
Tom New, 2 matches, 2001–2002
Gareth Parkin, 1 match, 2002 
Nemesh Patel, 7 matches, 1999–2002
Simon Pearson, 1 match, 2001 
Lee Pollard, 3 matches, 1999–2001
Anthony Pollock, 1 match, 1999 
Neil Pullen, 7 matches, 1999–2002
Luke Reeves, 3 matches, 2000–2001
Adam Rennocks, 3 matches, 2001–2002
James Smith, 2 matches, 1999–2000
Karl Smith, 1 match, 2001 
Michael Sutliff, 4 matches, 1999–2002
Matthew Trevor, 2 matches, 2002 
Paul Widdowson, 1 match, 2000 
Oliver Williams, 2 matches, 2002 
Ashley Wright, 3 matches, 1999–2000
Luke Wright, 1 match, 2001

References

Leicestershire Cricket Board